Alfredo J. Ramos is a Spanish poet and editor born in Talavera de la Reina, Toledo, Spain in 1954.

He was awarded a Bachelor of Information Science from the Complutense University in Madrid.

His first book of poetry, Esquinas del destierro (Corners of Exile) (1976), is a neo-romantic work and obtained a runner-up for the Adonais prize for unknown poets. He also wrote Territorio de gestos fugitivos (Territory of Fugitive Gestures) in 1980. With El sol de medianoche (The Midnight Sun) (1986), he won the Castilla-La Mancha Prize of Poetry. He is also editor and writer of the famous Espasa encyclopedia, the general encyclopedia printed in most of the world, with almost 200 volumes.

Ramos has also written many travelogue books, among them on the cities of the Camino de Santiago.

Works

Poetry

Travel 

 & Santiago Llorente

 & Fernando de Giles
 & Others
 & Others

References

1954 births
Living people
Print editors
20th-century Spanish poets
20th-century Spanish male writers